B'nai Emet Synagogue was a Conservative synagogue located in St. Louis Park, Minnesota affiliated with the United Synagogue of Conservative Judaism. St. Louis Park is a city in Hennepin County, Minnesota and a first ring-suburb immediately west of Minneapolis.

The synagogue had its origins in a number of earlier synagogues and congregations that merged in the course of a century, so that the earliest roots of B'nai Emet can be traced back from 1889 until it moved to its final location in 1956. It was used as a location for the Coen brothers' 2009 film A Serious Man. The congregation merged with Minnetonka's Adath Jeshurun Congregation in 2011, and put its building up for sale.

History

The synagogue's history reflects the emergence of organized Jewish communal and religious life in Minnesota.

The earliest synagogue component was Congregation B'nai Abraham established in 1889 and incorporated in 1891 in a South Minneapolis neighborhood by Romanian Jewish immigrants. It was known as the "Rumanian Schil" or the "Rumanian Hebrew Congregation."

The congregation's first home was located on 15th Avenue South between 3rd and 4th Streets. The structure seated about 300 people and was filled on Shabbat with the services following the customs of Romanian Jews.

The second building, B'nai Abraham's home for 36 years, was located at 825 Thirteenth Avenue South, purchased in 1920 for $10,000 (today $). In the early days, the synagogue had its own Talmud Torah (supplementary religious school for children's Torah study). In 1927, when Minneapolis Talmud Torah built a South Side structure, B'nai Abraham closed its Talmud Torah.

In 1942, Rabbi Hardin served for two years. Later, Rabbi Reuben Maier became spiritual leader of the congregation. Rabbi Maier's wife Sophie was the daughter of Rabbi Alexandru Șafran, chief rabbi of Romania until his death. In 1952, Rabbi Mordecai Liebhaber succeeded Rabbi Maier who undertook the relocation to St. Louis Park where a communal building was built to meet the spiritual, educational, and social needs of the growing Jewish population and resulted in a decision to establish a combined synagogue-Jewish center. B'nai Abraham worked with B'nai B'rith to achieve this end.

The congregation built a new sanctuary and center dedicated in 1959. This building had a number of multi-purpose rooms. The sanctuary, which seated 80, opened to a space used for an auditorium (increasing seating capacity to 1000) and gymnasium. B'nai Abraham grew from 10 families before the move in the 1950s to 400 families in 1971 when B'nai Abraham and Congregation Mikro-Tifereth voted to merge, creating B'nai Emet Synagogue, under the leadership of Rabbi Sylvan Kamens a noted Conservative rabbi.

As reported by the St. Louis Park Historical Society:

Work was begun on this first synagogue in the suburbs in July 1958. The $300,000 building at 3115 Ottawa Avenue was designed by Ackerman and Cooperman. It was completed in March 1959 and dedicated on June 19–21, 1959. 700 people came to the dedication, including Mayor Herbert Lefler, who welcomed the congregation to the Park. The 70-year-old congregation consisted of 373 families and was first known as B'Nai Abraham. In 1960 advertised as "Your NEW conservative congregation serving St. Louis Park and Hopkins."

The synagogue joined with others in support of various causes. It joined with the Reform movement in urging Senator Norm Coleman to oppose budget cuts in 2005. The synagogue offered a variety of programs: Introduction to Judaism Classes, Hebrew classes, discussion of intermarriage, adult education, "December Dilemma" discussions, Preparation for Conversion, Holiday "How-To" workshops, counseling, and lectures on intermarriage.
It has hosted a number of unique presentations such as dramatized storytelling.

By 2011 membership was down to 225, from a peak in the 1980s of over 900. The congregation merged with Minnetonka's Adath Jeshurun Congregation, and held its last service in June of that year. The building on Ottawa Avenue was put up for sale, with an anticipated closing in late 2011.
It is now owned by an Orthodox Jewish high school, known as Yeshiva of Minneapolis.

See also

List of synagogues in Minnesota

References

External links
B'nai Emet's historical records were merged as part of Adath Jeshurun's records. Finding aid to the Adath Jeshurun Congregation records at the Upper Midwest Jewish Archives, University of Minnesota Libraries. 

Conservative synagogues in Minnesota
Romanian-Jewish culture in the United States
Religious organizations established in 1889
1889 establishments in Minnesota
Synagogues completed in 1959
1959 establishments in Minnesota
St. Louis Park, Minnesota